Lipsko  is a village in the administrative district of Gmina Zamość, within Zamość County, Lublin Voivodeship, in southeastern Poland.

References

Lipsko